Robert Aylesham (died c. September 1379) was an English medieval university vice-chancellor and chancellor.

Aylesham was at Merton College, Oxford and became Vice-Chancellor of the University of Oxford in 1377. He became Chancellor of the university in 1379. He died around September in the year he was appointed Chancellor.

References

Bibliography
 

Year of birth unknown
1379 deaths
Fellows of Merton College, Oxford
Vice-Chancellors of the University of Oxford
Chancellors of the University of Oxford
14th-century English people